The 1993 Big South Conference baseball tournament  was the postseason baseball tournament for the Big South Conference, held from May 13 through 16 at Charles Watson Stadium home field of Coastal Carolina in Conway, South Carolina.  The top six finishers from the regular season participated in the double-elimination tournament. The champion, won the title for the first time and earned an invitation to the 1993 NCAA Division I baseball tournament.

Format
The top six finishers from the regular season qualified for the tournament.  The teams were seeded one through six and played a double-elimination tournament.  UNC Greensboro was ineligible for conference competition.

Bracket and results

All-Tournament Team

Most Valuable Player
Rich Humphrey was named Tournament Most Valuable Player.  Humphrey was a pitcher for Liberty.

References

Tournament
Big South Conference Baseball Tournament
Big South baseball tournament
Big South Conference baseball tournament